Terra Rica is a municipality in the state of Paraná in the Southern Region of Brazil.

History 
Terra Rica was elevated to the status of a municipality by the state law number 253, on November the 26th, 1954.

See also
List of municipalities in Paraná

References

Municipalities in Paraná